Brooke Smith is a historic neighborhood in Houston, Texas. Founded in 1905, it encompasses approximately 1,400 homes in the 77009 ZIP code. A central part of the neighborhood is Montie Beach Park, located at the center of the community. The park is also the name for Brooke Smith's neighborhood, Montie Beach Civic Club

External links
 Montie Beach Civic Club

Neighborhoods in Houston